Johann Lengoualama (born 29 September 1992) is a Gabonese professional footballer who currently plays for Al-Qous as a forward.

After playing four years in Morocco with Difaâ El Jadidi and Renaissance Sportive de Berkane, Lengoualama signed for Portugal's LigaPro side F.C. Famalicão at age 23.

Honours 
AS Mangasport
Winner
 Gabon Championnat National D1: 2013–14

References

External links 
 
 
 

1992 births
Living people
Gabonese footballers
Association football forwards
Gabon international footballers
2015 Africa Cup of Nations players
AS Mangasport players
Difaâ Hassani El Jadidi players
RS Berkane players
Olympic Club de Safi players
F.C. Famalicão players
Raja CA players
Al-Faisaly SC players
US Monastir (football) players
Jeddah Club players
Al-Qous FC players
Saudi First Division League players
Saudi Second Division players
Gabonese expatriate footballers
Expatriate footballers in Morocco
Expatriate footballers in Portugal
Expatriate footballers in Jordan
Expatriate footballers in Tunisia
Expatriate footballers in Saudi Arabia
Gabonese expatriate sportspeople in Morocco
Gabonese expatriate sportspeople in Portugal
Gabonese expatriate sportspeople in Jordan
Gabonese expatriate sportspeople in Tunisia
Gabonese expatriate sportspeople in Saudi Arabia
21st-century Gabonese people
Gabon A' international footballers
2011 African Nations Championship players